Dactylopteryx orientalis is a species of praying mantis in the family Dactylopterygidae.

See also
List of mantis genera and species

References

Hymenopodidae
Insects described in 1906